Dimitrios Janulidis (born 1 February 1956) is a Czech gymnast. He competed in eight events at the 1976 Summer Olympics.

References

1956 births
Living people
Czech male artistic gymnasts
Olympic gymnasts of Czechoslovakia
Gymnasts at the 1976 Summer Olympics
Sportspeople from Brno